The Heidkopf is a  high hill in the Wiehen in Minden-Lübbecke district within the borough of Lübbecke. It lies one kilometre north of the Heidbrink and 500 metres northeast of the Reineberg.

The Heidkopf is not very spectacular and is not well known even amongst the townsfolk of Lübbecke. Its summit is partly covered by old beech trees. A footpath runs from the northeast up to the summit. A metalled forest track runs around the hill. Between the Reineberg and the Heidkopf is a ravine that is still very much in a natural state, in which a stream rises, taking its source water from the Wittekind Spring.

Gallery 

Minden-Lübbecke
Wiehen Hills
Lübbecke